The Embassy of the Kingdom of the Netherlands in London is the diplomatic mission of the Netherlands in the United Kingdom.

The embassy is currently situated in a red brick mansion block at Hyde Park Gate, which it has occupied since 1953. It was reported in 2013 that the embassy was planning to move to a new building in Nine Elms. In 2019 the site at Nine Elms was sold by the Dutch government, with no embassy built.

Gallery

See also 
 Netherlands–United Kingdom relations

References

External links

 The Embassy of the Kingdom of the Netherlands in London, official website

Buildings and structures in the Royal Borough of Kensington and Chelsea
Netherlands
Diplomatic missions of the Netherlands
Netherlands–United Kingdom relations
South Kensington